The Centro Israelita de República Dominicana is the main synagogue of the Jewish community in the Dominican Republic.

See also
 History of the Jews in the Dominican Republic

Buildings and structures in Santo Domingo
Sephardi Jewish culture in the Caribbean
Synagogues in the Dominican Republic